The Proclamation of the Birth of Christ, Kalenda Proclamation, or Christmas Proclamation, is a chant sung before the Midnight Mass for Christmas in the Roman Rite of the Catholic Church. The long text is a timeline, in which each verse represents the years from an historical event, either secular or religious, until birth of Jesus Christ, and the number of years – expressed in centuries or years – decreases until the day of the first Christmas.

Ceremonial 
Originating from the Roman Martyrology, traditionally read during the hour of Prime, the proclamation places the birth of Christ "within the context of salvation history." Prime was suppressed as part of the liturgical reforms following Vatican II, but Pope John Paul II restored the usage of the Proclamation during the 1980 Papal Christmas Midnight Mass. Since then, many parishes re-instituted the Proclamation as well.

In the Ordinary Form of the Roman Rite, the Christmas Proclamation is chanted during Midnight Mass.

Translations
As the official Latin text of the Roman Martyrology has been updated, the English translation of the Proclamation has changed as well.

1584 text

Current text

See also
Exsultet
Catholic liturgy
Koliada

References

External links
 A side by side comparison of various English translations Retrieved 29 June 2015
 The Kalenda Proclamation from the Vatican

Catholic liturgy
Christmastide
Nativity of Jesus in worship and liturgy